Jiří Jarošík  (born 27 October 1977) is a Czech professional football manager and former player. In his playing career, he played as a defender and midfielder. Jarošík started his club career in his native Czech Republic, winning six league titles in seven years with Sparta Prague. He then headed abroad to continue his football career, spending eight years playing for various teams including CSKA Moscow, Chelsea, Birmingham City, Celtic, Krylia Sovetov and Real Zaragoza. During this time, he became the first footballer ever to win league titles in four different countries. He then returned to Sparta, although only for two seasons, after which he headed to Spain to play for Deportivo Alavés.

Jarošík played for the Czech national team, making 23 appearances without scoring between 2000 and 2005.

Club career

Early career
Born in Ústí nad Labem, then Czechoslovakia, Jarošík began his career with Sparta Prague in his native Czech Republic. He had a two-year loan spell at Slovan Liberec before establishing himself in the first team at Sparta. Jarošík's appearances caught the eye of CSKA Moscow, who paid a then Russian record of about $3.5 million to acquire him in 2003.

Chelsea
On 6 January 2005, Jarošík was purchased by Premier League club Chelsea for an undisclosed fee, thought to be about £3 million. On 27 February, he started the League Cup final, which Chelsea won 3–2 against Liverpool. Chelsea won the 2004–05 Premier League title and Jarošík made enough league appearances (14) to earn a championship medal.

Birmingham City
In August 2005, after Chelsea purchased Michael Essien, Jarošík found himself out of the first team and was loaned to fellow Premier League side Birmingham City for the 2005–06 season. At Birmingham, he was the team's joint-top goalscorer, albeit with just eight goals, becoming better known for his long-range shooting than the defensive responsibilities which gave him his name at Moscow. After finishing a disappointing season for the Midlands side, Birmingham had the option to make the deal permanent when the spell ended, but following their relegation, they did not do so. He finished his loan period at St Andrew's in May 2006, and returned to Chelsea not knowing where his future would lie, due to there being heavy competition for places at the club.

Celtic
On 19 June 2006, Jarošík left Chelsea and signed a three-year deal with Scottish Premier League champions Celtic for an undisclosed fee, rumoured to be around the £2 million mark. He scored on his Celtic debut in a 4–1 victory over Kilmarnock at Celtic Park. Competition from other midfielders such as Evander Sno, Aiden McGeady and Paul Hartley meant that first team opportunities were limited for Jarošík, but he still made several notable contributions to Celtic's success, including winning both the free kicks from which Shunsuke Nakamura scored in the two Champions League group stage matches against Manchester United – the second put Celtic into the last 16. On 6 December 2006, Jarošík also scored Celtic's goal in a 3–1 Champions League group stage loss at Copenhagen. On 14 January 2007, he scored the winner in a 2–1 win over Hearts with a stunning long-range strike. Celtic won the 2006–07 league title in Jarošík's first season with the club, meaning that he had won league medals in a record four countries – the Czech Republic, Russia, England and Scotland.

Despite the signings of Massimo Donati and Scott Brown for the 2007–08 season, which made midfield competition even tighter than before, Jarošík remained with Celtic. On 3 October, Jarošík made his first Celtic start in over six months in Celtic's 2–1 Champions League group stage victory over A.C. Milan at Celtic Park. On 28 November, Jarošík scored Celtic's equaliser in another Champions League group stage match – this time against Shakhtar Donetsk – with a spectacular left-footed volley. The match ended 2–1 to Celtic.

Krylia Sovetov
On 31 January 2008, Jarošík signed for Russian club Krylia Sovetov for a reported fee of €1 million.

Real Zaragoza
On 14 January 2010, Jarošík signed for Spanish club Real Zaragoza on a free transfer. He scored his first goal for the club with a header in a 1–1 draw with Atlético Madrid in a league match.

Sparta Prague
On 13 August 2011, Jarošík re-signed with his former club Sparta Prague as a free agent.

Deportivo Alavés
On 26 August 2013, Jarošík signed as a free agent for Deportivo Alavés, a club that just promoted to the Spanish Second Division.

International career
Jarošík played 23 times for the Czech Republic national team, although he was not included in the squads for Euro 2004, the 2006 World Cup or Euro 2008.

Managerial statistics

Honours
Sparta Prague
Czech First League: 1996–97, 1997–98, 1998–99, 1999–2000, 2000–01, 2002–03

CSKA Moscow
Russian Premier League: 2003
Russian Super Cup: 2004

Chelsea
Premier League: 2004–05
Football League Cup: 2004–05

Celtic
Scottish Premier League: 2006–07
Scottish Cup: 2006–07

References

External links

Jarošík's page at Celtic's official site
Jarošík's page at ESPN's Soccernet 

1977 births
Living people
Sportspeople from Ústí nad Labem
Czech footballers
Czech Republic youth international footballers
Czech Republic under-21 international footballers
Czech Republic international footballers
Czech expatriate footballers
AC Sparta Prague players
FC Slovan Liberec players
PFC CSKA Moscow players
Chelsea F.C. players
Birmingham City F.C. players
Celtic F.C. players
PFC Krylia Sovetov Samara players
Real Zaragoza players
Deportivo Alavés players
Czech First League players
Russian Premier League players
Premier League players
Scottish Premier League players
La Liga players
Segunda División players
Expatriate footballers in Russia
Expatriate footballers in England
Expatriate footballers in Scotland
Expatriate footballers in Spain
Czech expatriate sportspeople in Russia
Czech expatriate sportspeople in England
Czech expatriate sportspeople in Scotland
Czech expatriate sportspeople in Spain
Czech expatriate sportspeople in Slovenia
Association football defenders
Association football midfielders
Czech football managers
Czech expatriate football managers
Expatriate football managers in Slovenia
FK Ústí nad Labem managers
NK Celje managers
FK Teplice managers
Czech First League managers
Czech National Football League managers